

See also
List of United States Air Force squadrons

Air Operations